Kari Nielsen (born 26 May 1959) is a former Norwegian footballer, known as the first goal scorer for the Norway women's national football team.

International career
Nielsen was also part of the Norwegian team at the 1987 European Championships.  Kari Nielsen scored 14 goals in 49 appearances for Norway.

Honours

Norway
UEFA Women's Championship: 1987

References 

1959 births
People from Sør-Odal
Norwegian women's footballers
Norway women's international footballers
Toppserien players
Women's association football forwards
Norwegian women's football managers
Asker Fotball (women) players
UEFA Women's Championship-winning players
Living people